Anna Ziaja (born August 1, 1954 in Wrocław) is a Polish contemporary painter and print maker.

Biography 

Ziaja was educated in the faculty of painting and graphic arts at the  Academy of Fine Arts in Warsaw, and graduated with an honours degree in 1979.

Her unique vision of contemporary art comes from her love of Italian art from  Trecento to Cinquecento,from Masaccio to Vittore Carpaccio fused with her Polish heritage and paintings of Zygmunt Waliszewski and Eugeniusz Zak. Her concepts are an expression of poetry and personal contemplation, from the melancholic to sometimes bitter reflection.  Ziaja's paintings present a psychological abstract of human fate; a depiction of multifaceted personalities inexorable linked in everyday complexities, portraying the individualism of the world.

Ziaja lives in Warsaw Poland and Modena Italy.

Exhibitions 

Participated in exhibitions of Polish art:
 1983 - "Młoda Polska graphics", Oerdinghausen, Germany
 1985 - "Wystawa Środowiska Warszawskiego", Zachęta, Warsaw, Poland,
 1986 - "4 polish artists in AF Galerie", Wiesbaden, Germany
 1986 - "Polskie Malarstwo Współczesne" AF Galerie Wiesbaden, Germany,
 1987 - "Sztuka jako wolność", BWA Koszalin, Poland,
 1988 - "Nowe Malowanie" Instytut Polski, Praga, Czech Republic
 1988 - "Wystawa Møodej Polskiej Plastyki Arsenał '88", Hala Gwardii, Warsaw, Poland,
 1989 - A hundred colours, Dijkstra Galerie, Amsterdam, the Netherlands
 1989 - "Biało-Czerwone" Hala Gwardii, Warsaw, Poland,
 1990 - "5 Malarzy z Warszawy", Merz Contemporary Art, London, Great Britain
 1990 - "RAJ" Fundacja Sztuki Współczesnej, Monetti gallery, Warsaw, Poland,
 1990 - "Pologne '90", Hotel de Ville de Saints, Gille's, Bruxelles, Belgium
 1990 - "Inter Art", Andrzeja Kareński gallery, Poznań, Poland,
 1990 - "Art Fair", Hamburg, Germany
 1990 - "Dziwny Świat", Monetti gallery, Warsaw
 1990/91 - "The Expressive Struggle 28 Contemporary Polish Artists, Museum Academy of Fine Art. New York, Cleveland State University, Ohio, USA
 1991 - "paintings Polskie", Polish Museum of America, Chicago, USA
 1992 - "The Expressive Struggle", Andersen Gallery, Buffalo, New York, USA
 2002 - Warszawski Przegląd Malarstwa, exhibition accompanying the Jan Cybis award, DAP, Warsaw, Poland,
 2004 - Fidusiewicz i przyjaciele, sport in art, Centrum Olimpijskie, Warsaw, Poland,
 2007 - Sport in art, Fidusiewicz with friends, selected artists, Centrum Olimpijskie, Warsaw, Poland,
 2008 - "Arsenał 20 years later..." winners of the exhibition Arsenał'88, Centrum Olimpijskie, Warsaw, Poland,
 2012 - "3 światy czyli 150 lat polskiej sztuki współczesnej", Zadra gallery, Warsaw, Poland,

and individual exhibitions:
 1979 - paintings and graphics, Centro Culturale "L'indiscreto", Roma, Italy,
 1979 - paintings and graphics, Centro Studi "L.A.Muratori", Modena, Italy,
 1980 - paintings and graphics, "Nowy Świat 23" gallery, Warsaw, Poland,
 1981 - paintings and graphics, "Nowy Świat" gallery, Warsaw, Poland,
 1982 - graphics, Pontremoli, Italy,
 1982 - graphics, Centro Studi "L.A. Muratori", Modena, Italy,
 1982 - graphics, Como, Italy,
 1989 - paintings, "test" gallery, Warsaw, Poland,
 1990 - paintings, Brama gallery, Warsaw, Poland,
 1990 - paintings, Katarzyna Baumann gallery, Fryburg, Switzerland,
 1991 - paintings, "Mexpol Galerie", Düsseldorf, Germany,
 1992 - paintings, Brama gallery, Warsaw, Poland,
 1992 - paintings, BWA, Ciechanów, Poland,
 1993 - paintings, Ostrołęka gallery, Ostrołęka, Poland,
 1993 - paintings, Francisca gallery, Arhus, Denmark,
 1994 - paintings, "Pod Atlantami" gallery, Walbrzych, Poland,
 1995 - paintings, BWA, Jelenia Góra, Poland,
 1995 - paintings, BWA, Zamość, Poland,
 1998 - paintings, Brama gallery, Warsaw, Poland,
 2008 - paintings, "-1" gallery, Centrum Olimpijskie, Warsaw, Poland,
 2008 - paintings, Atrium gallery, Akademia Leona Koźminskiego, Warsaw, Poland,
 2012 - paintings, "Trzy Swiaty - Brodowska, Jampolski, Ziaja", Zadra gallery, Warsaw, Poland.

References

Slownik Malarzy Polskich, wydawnictwo Arkady, Warsaw 2001
Wielka Encyklopedia Malarstwa Polskiego, Wydawnictwo Kluszczyński, Kraków 2011

Sources 
 Teresa Hrankowska, 1994: Sztuka a erotyka Materiały Sesji Stowarzyszenia Historyków Sztuki, Ośrodek Wydawniczy Arx Regia, Warsaw. 
 Jarosław M. Daszkiewicz, 1995: Malarstwo Młodych, Wydawnictwa Artystyczne i Filmowe, Warsaw. 
 2001: Słownik Malarzy Polskich Od dwudziestolecia międzywojennego do końca XX wieku, Wydawnictwo Arkady, Warsaw. 
 Kama Zboralska, 2004: Sztuka inwestowania w SZTUKĘ, Wydawnictwo Rosner & Wspólnicy, Warsaw. 
 2011: Wielka Encyklopedia Malarstwa Polskiego, Wydawnictwo Kluszczyński, Kraków. 
 Polski Komitet Olimpijski, 2016: Galeria (-1) Wystawy Sztuki Współczesnej Polski Komitet Olimpijski 2006-2016, Polski Komitet Olimpijski, Warsaw

External links 
 official artist website

20th-century Polish painters
21st-century Polish painters
Polish women painters
Living people
1954 births
Academy of Fine Arts in Warsaw alumni
20th-century Polish women